Bryan Ezra Tsumoru Clay (born January 3, 1980) is an American decathlete who was the 2008 Summer Olympic champion for the decathlon and was also World champion in 2005.

Biography
Clay was born in Austin, Texas and raised in Hawaii. He is Afro-Asian. His mother, Michele Ishimoto, was a Japanese immigrant to America. His father, Greg Clay, was African-American. His parents divorced when he was in elementary school and he was raised primarily by his mother.

Clay has a younger brother, Nikolas, who was also a standout athlete on the Azusa Pacific University track team.

On March 23, 2013 Bryan Clay was inducted into the Azusa Pacific Hall of Fame in Track and Field.

He graduated from James B. Castle High School (Kaneohe, Hawaii) in 1998.

Clay is married to Sarah Smith. They have a son, Jacob (born 2005) and two daughters, Katherine (Kate) (born 2007) and Elizabeth (Ellie) (born 2010). Clay believes that a balance of mental, physical and emotional health will help him in athletic competition.

Clay addressed the 2008 Republican National Convention. Clay is a devoted Christian.

Athletic career
He competed in track and field in high school, during which time he was coached by Dacre Bowen and Martin Hee. He then attended Azusa Pacific University, an Evangelical Christian college near Los Angeles, California, where he competed in the National Association of Intercollegiate Athletics and was coached by Mike Barnett, who still coaches him.  Clay still trains at Azusa Pacific University. Clay decided to compete in the decathlon after persuasion from Olympian Chris Huffins.

Clay won the silver medal at the 2004 Olympics, and finished first at the 2005 World Championships. He was unable to complete the 2007 World Championships due to injuries, dropping out after four events.

Clay won the gold medal at the 2008 Olympics in the decathlon. His victory margin of 240 points in the 2008 Beijing Olympics was the largest since 1972. The Olympic decathlon champion is  referred to as the "World's Greatest Athlete" and prior to the Olympics, Clay was tested by SPARQ to establish his SPARQ Rating across a number of different sports.  The test is meant to measure sport-specific athleticism and in the football test Clay recorded a score of 130.40, the highest ever recorded up to that point. By comparison, Reggie Bush scored a 93.38 on the popular test.

He is one of two Olympians featured on a special edition post-Beijing Olympics Wheaties cereal box; the other was gymnast Nastia Liukin.

His attempts to regain his World Championships decathlon title were thwarted by a hamstring injury in June 2009. This caused him to drop out of the US trials; thus, he missed the chance to compete at the 2009 World Championships in Berlin. He returned to action in 2010 and won the men's heptathlon at the 2010 IAAF World Indoor Championships. At the start of his outdoor season he won the 2010 Hypo-Meeting, holding off the challenge from Romain Barras.

In 2012, Clay had returned to the Olympic Trials in hopes of making a third Olympics and defending his title.  Defending the title was a feat only achieved twice, by Bob Mathias and by Daley Thompson.  That attempt was quashed at the beginning of the second day, when he tripped over the 9th hurdle in the 110 metres hurdles, then off balance pushed over the 10th hurdle.  He was initially disqualified for pushing over the hurdle, but that decision was reversed, allowing him a mark for running 16.81, last in the field over a second and a half slower than the next best competitor.  Thinking he had been disqualified in the hurdles, Clay followed the hurdle accident with three straight fouls in the discus throws, but he still completed the competition.

Achievements

2010 IAAF World Indoor Championships - gold medal
Athletics at the 2008 Summer Olympics – Men's decathlon - gold medal
2008 IAAF World Indoor Championships - gold medal
2005 World Championships in Athletics - gold medal
Athletics at the 2004 Summer Olympics – Men's decathlon - silver medal
2004 World Indoor Championships - silver medal

Personal best

Decathlon - 8832

Decathlon events:

100 m - 10.35
400 m - 47.78
110 m hurdles - 13.64
1500 m - 4:38.93
Long jump - 8.06
High jump - 2.10
Pole vault - 5.15
Shot put - 16.27
Discus throw - 55.87 (world decathlon best)
Javelin throw - 72.00

Others:

60 m - 6.65
60 m hurdles - 7.77
200 m - 21.34
1000 m - 2:49.41
Heptathlon - 6371

Politics
Clay spoke at the Republican National Convention in 2008.

See also
List of Olympic decathlon medalists
Black conservatism in the United States

References

External links

 
 
 
 
 
 
  
 iPhone App
  
 

1980 births
Living people
American male decathletes
African-American Christians
African-American male track and field athletes
Hawaii Republicans
Olympic gold medalists for the United States in track and field
Olympic silver medalists for the United States in track and field
Athletes (track and field) at the 2004 Summer Olympics
Athletes (track and field) at the 2008 Summer Olympics
Azusa Pacific University alumni
Sportspeople from Austin, Texas
Sportspeople from Honolulu
American sportspeople of Japanese descent
World Athletics Championships medalists
Medalists at the 2008 Summer Olympics
Medalists at the 2004 Summer Olympics
Track and field athletes from Hawaii
World Athletics Indoor Championships winners
World Athletics Championships winners
21st-century African-American sportspeople
20th-century African-American people